Ruah Midbar (lit. Desert Wind) is a rehabilitation centre in southern Israel. Located between Ashalim and Tlalim, it falls under the jurisdiction of Ramat HaNegev Regional Council.

The centre was opened in 2010 as a collaboration between the regional council, the Anti-Drug Authority, the Jewish National Fund, Mifal HaPayis, the Rashi Foundation and several government departments. It serves people suffering from drug and alcohol addiction and eating disorders, and is run by the Yahadu Association.

References

Populated places established in 2010
2010 establishments in Israel
Populated places in Southern District (Israel)